The 1978 Individual Speedway Junior European Championship was the second edition of the European Under-21 Championships.

European Final
July 22, 1978
 Lonigo, Santa Marina Stadium

References

1978
European Individual U-21
Speedway competitions in Italy
1978 in Italian motorsport